Sandra Naćuk (born 17 August 1980) is a former professional tennis player who played for Serbia and Montenegro. She reached her highest singles ranking of world No. 81 in August 1999.

Naćuk's career highlight was reaching the third round of the 2000 Wimbledon Championships singles tournament, defeating Jelena Kostanić and Lucie Ahl. She won one WTA Tour doubles title in her career, at Budapest in 1999, partnering with Eugenia Kulikovskaya. She also won her biggest ITF Women's Circuit singles title in 1998 at Poitiers.

WTA career finals

Doubles: 3 (1–2)

ITF finals

Singles (4–1)

Doubles (5–4)

References

External links
 
 
 

1980 births
Living people
Sportspeople from Novi Sad
Serbian female tennis players
Serbia and Montenegro female tennis players